Koen Andries is a Belgian Janssen Pharmaceutica scientist and professor at the University of Antwerp. In 2005 he and his team published a discovery about a new di-Aryl-Quinoline-based drug (R207910), now called bedaquiline, which promises a shorter and simpler treatment for drug resistant Tuberculosis (TB).

Career
Andries graduated as a Veterinarian and obtained a PhD at the University of Ghent (Ghent, Belgium) in 1975. He continued his career at the university until 1982, when he started working at Janssen Pharmaceutica in Beerse until 2004. In 2004 he continued his research at Tibotec in Mechelen.

Recognition
2014 winner of the European Inventor Award in the Industry category  awarded by the European Patent Office.

References

External links
 Koen Andries (University of Antwerp)
 Koen Andries and his team (European Patent Office)

Living people
Belgian pharmacologists
Flemish scientists
Johnson & Johnson people
Male veterinarians
Ghent University alumni
Academic staff of the University of Antwerp
Belgian veterinarians
Year of birth missing (living people)